Walter "Christy" Walsh (December 2, 1891 –  December 29, 1955) was an American writer, cartoonist, and sports agent. He is known for acting as Babe Ruth's agent, and is considered to be the first baseball sports agent.

Early career
Walsh graduated from St. Vincent's College in Los Angeles, California in 1911. Walsh was trained as a lawyer, but began his career with the Los Angeles Herald as a reporter and cartoonist. He began working as a ghostwriter in 1912 when he interviewed Christy Mathewson while Mathewson was vacationing in California.

In 1921, Walsh ghostwrote an article for World War I flying ace Eddie Rickenbacker in which he described the 1921 Indianapolis 500. Walsh and Rickenbacker split the profits of approximately $800.

Walsh later moved to New York City and was hired by Maxwell-Chalmers Automobiles in advertising. After being fired, he decided to ghostwrite for athletes full-time.

Ghostwriting syndicate and later career
Between 1921 and 1938, Walsh built and ran a successful ghostwriting syndicate of thirty-four baseball writers. His writers included Ford Frick, Damon Runyon, Bozeman Bulger, and Gene Fowler, among others. Walsh's writers earned $100,000 between 1921 and 1936, and grossed $43,000 in their peak year of 1929.

The players Walsh represented included Ruth, Ty Cobb, Dizzy Dean, Rogers Hornsby, John McGraw, Walter Johnson, and Lou Gehrig. Walsh went to great lengths to sign clients. Besides becoming a delivery boy to meet Ruth, Walsh pursued Walter Johnson into the Pullman's washroom in New Haven, Connecticut. Johnson was paid $1,000, and eventually made $7,000.

In 1931, Walsh was hired to write and narrate three short films for Universal Pictures to be called "The Christy Walsh All American Sports Reel". The films were to feature Knute Rockne. The first short film produced, Various Shifts (1931), was a visit with Walsh and Rockne at Notre Dame as Rockne and the Notre Dame football team demonstrated various football shifts. The second short film was Carry On (1931), with Walsh as narrator mourning the death of Rockne who died in a plane crash in March 1931. 

In 1939, Walsh served as Sports Director for the New York World's Fair.

In 1945, Walsh was Associate Producer for a 20th Century Fox feature film about Eddie Rickenbacker. Captain Eddie was released on June 19, 1945, and starred Fred MacMurray as Captain Eddie Rickenbacker, and also featured Charles Bickford, Lynn Bari, Lloyd Nolan and Spring Byington.

Personal life and death
Christy Walsh was born in St. Louis, Missouri, on December 2, 1891. On April 4, 1935, he married Madeline Souden. The couple had only one child and their marriage ended in divorce. Walsh was also the father-in-law of Peggy Cobb, the stepdaughter of Robert Cobb, the owner of the famous Brown Derby Restaurant.

Walsh died on December 14, 1955, in North Hollywood, California.

References

1891 births
1955 deaths
American sports agents
Ghostwriters